Robert Mackenzie is an Australian supervising sound editor. He is best known for his work on Animal Kingdom (2010), The Hunter (2011), Lore (2012), Felony (2013), The Grandmaster (2013), The Rover (2014), Deadline Gallipoli (2015), Partisan (2015), Lion, and critically acclaimed war-drama film Hacksaw Ridge, for which he received two Academy Award nominations at the 89th Academy Awards, Best Sound Editing and Best Sound Mixing (both shared with Andy Wright).

Awards
 Won: AACTA Award for Best Sound - Hacksaw Ridge
 Won: Academy Award for Best Sound Mixing - Hacksaw Ridge
 Won: Satellite Award for Best Sound - Hacksaw Ridge
 Nominated CAS Award for Outstanding Achievement in Sound Mixing for a Motion Picture – Live Action 
 Nominated: Academy Award for Best Sound Editing - Hacksaw Ridge
 Nominated: BAFTA Award for Best Sound - Hacksaw Ridge

References

External links
 

Living people

Year of birth missing (living people)

Australian audio engineers

Australian sound editors
Best Sound Mixing Academy Award winners